Lai Ying-fang ; born 1959) is a Taiwanese politician. 

Lai was elected to the Legislative Yuan as a political independent representing Nantou County in 1992. He then served as deputy magistrate of Nantou County under Peng Pai-hsien. When Peng was removed from office, Lai assumed the Nantou County magistracy on an acting basis.

References

1959 births
Living people
Members of the 2nd Legislative Yuan
Nantou County Members of the Legislative Yuan
Magistrates of Nantou County